José Muñoz Molleda (1905–1988) was a Spanish composer, journalist, jurist and politician. He was one of the "músicos del '27."

Works, editions and recordings
 José Muñoz Molleda. Obras para orquesta - Circo. Variaciones sobre un tema. Introducción y fuga. Sinfonía en la menor.
 Muñoz Molleda: Farruca Narciso Yepes (guitar)

Selected filmography
 Goyescas (1942)
 The House of Rain (1943)
 The Bullfighter's Suit (1947)
 A Toast for Manolete (1948)
 Two Paths (1954)
 High Fashion (1954)
 As Long as You Live (1955)

References

Spanish composers
Spanish male composers
1905 births
1988 deaths
20th-century composers
20th-century Spanish musicians
20th-century Spanish male musicians